Say Cheese (Chinese: 西瓜甜不甜) was a Singaporean drama produced by Mediacorp Studios and telecast on Mediacorp Channel 8. It consisted of 20 episodes and was aired at 9 pm on weekdays and had a repeat telecast at 8 am the following day.

Synopsis
Peace Photography Studio is an established but traditional studio founded 80 years ago and had 5 branches in its heyday. Now, there's only a single studio left and is managed by Pan Renyi (Richard Low) and daughter Pan Zejia (Joanne Peh). Pan Zejia quietly helped out at the studio as she feels indebted to Pan Renyi who helped her settle a huge debt 10 years ago, and as a result, she remained single since then.

Ke Yuanhang (Romeo Tan) is a newspaper reporter who is kind and magnanimous, although 5 years younger than Pan Zejia, a friendship soon developed. While Pan Zejia is irritable and impatient, Ke Yuanhang is gentle and caring. Their hindrances do not stop there, as Pan Renyi is constantly at loggerheads with Ke Yuanhang's mother, Hong Ziyi (Chen Liping). Due to Pan Renyi's temperament, he does not get along with all his children, the matter is made worse when Pan Zejia's mother suddenly died in a car accident.

Cast

 Chen Liping as Hong Ziyi (洪紫怡)
 Romeo Tan as Ke Yuanhang (柯远航)

(Phua)'s Family

Others

Awards & Nominations
Say Cheese is up for four nominations.

It did not win any of the nominations.

Star Awards 2019

Asian Academy Creative Awards

Original Sound Tracks

See also
 List of MediaCorp Channel 8 Chinese drama series (2010s)

References 

2018 Singaporean television series debuts
2018 Singaporean television series endings
Mediacorp Chinese language programmes
Mandarin-language television shows
Singapore Chinese dramas
Channel 8 (Singapore) original programming